The Ohlman-Shannon House is a historic house in Yankton, South Dakota. It was built in 1871 for Charles Mclntyre, who sold it to Martin P. Ohlman, Sr. in 1878. Ohlman was a real estate investor who served as the president of the American National Bank and as a director and treasurer of the Yankton Bridge and Ferry Company. The house remained in the Ohlman family until 1975, when his granddaughter, married to William
Shannon, sold it to John Marmelink. It was designed in the Italianate architectural style. It has been listed on the National Register of Historic Places since May 28, 1976.

See also
List of the oldest buildings in South Dakota

References

	
National Register of Historic Places in Yankton County, South Dakota
Italianate architecture in South Dakota
Houses completed in 1871
1871 establishments in Dakota Territory